Lucas Ezequiel Fernández (born July 20, 1988 in Buenos Aires) is an Argentine footballer currently playing for Chaco For Ever.

References

External links
 
 
 Lucas Fernández on Independiente Fontana official website

1988 births
Living people
Argentine footballers
Argentine expatriate footballers
Association football fullbacks
USL Championship players
Primera Nacional players
Torneo Federal A players
Argentinos Juniors footballers
C.D. Jorge Wilstermann players
C.A. Progreso players
Rochester New York FC players
Chaco For Ever footballers
Gimnasia y Esgrima de Mendoza footballers
Club Atlético Alvarado players
Argentine expatriate sportspeople in Bolivia
Expatriate footballers in Bolivia
Argentine expatriate sportspeople in Uruguay
Expatriate footballers in Uruguay
Expatriate soccer players in the United States
Footballers from Buenos Aires